DNA Show Vol.1 (stylized as DなSHOW Vol.1) is the fourth Japanese tour by Daesung.

History
On June 26, 2017, YGEX announced that Daesung will embark on a nationwide solo hall tour, with 28 shows to start on August. More than 350,000 people tried to buy tickets to his concerts, which is six times bigger than the expected number, resulting an eleven additional shows, rising the number to 39 concerts in 18 cities, and a total of 88,000 people will be attending his concerts.

On August 11, YGEX announced two final shows to be held in Hawaii at Hawaii Theatre.

Tour dates

References

External links
Official Site
YG Entertainment
Big Bang Japan Official Site

2017 concert tours
2018 concert tours
Daesung concert tours